The Donald may refer to:
 Donald Trump (born 1946), businessman and 45th president of the United States
r/The_Donald, a former discussion forum about Donald Trump on Reddit
 TheDonald.win, the former name for Patriots.win, an independent discussion forum about Donald Trump

Nicknames in business
Nicknames of politicians